Husky Stadium may refer to:
 Husky Stadium (St. Cloud), a venue in Minnesota, opened in 2004
 Husky Stadium (Houston Baptist University), a venue in Texas, opened in 2014 
 Husky Stadium, a stadium in Washington, opened in 1920

See also
 Huskie Stadium, a stadium in Illinois, opened in 1965
 Huskies Stadium, a stadium in Halifax, Canada, opened 1970 and demolished in 2013
 Husky Ballpark, University of Washington's baseball stadium
 Husky Field, Houston Baptist University's baseball stadium, opened in 1993.
 Husky Field (softball), Houston Baptist University's softball stadium, opened in 1993.
 Husky Softball Stadium, University of Washington's softball stadium, opened in 1994.